5th Fighter Group "Kos" was a fighter group of the Polish Air Forces in France, formed in May 1940. It was based in Bourges, France, with the mission of protecting the Hanriot aircraft factories. The group included 7 pilots and had Curtiss P-36 Hawk fighter aircraft. It was disestablished after the Fall of France in 1940.

The formation had 4 air victories without suffering its own casualties.

Members 
 capain Bronisław Kosiński (leader)
 lieutenant Marian Wesołowski
 platoon-leader Jan Kremski
 corporal Adolf Pietrasiak
 corporal Wacław Giermer
 lieutenant colonel Marcel Haegelen
 sergant Wilhelm Kosarz

Citations

Notes

References

Bibliography 
 Pilot Wojenny. 4(7)/2000, 07. 2000. Warsaw. ECHO.
 Pilot Wojenny. 3(15)/2001, 04.2001. Warsaw. ECHO.

Fighter aircraft units and formations
Battle of France
Military units and formations established in 1940
Military units and formations disestablished in 1940
Polish Air Force in exile squadrons